Diego Lo Brutto (born 26 August 1953) is a French wrestler. He competed in the men's freestyle 52 kg at the 1976 Summer Olympics and placed 6th.

References

External links
 

1953 births
Living people
French male sport wrestlers
Olympic wrestlers of France
Wrestlers at the 1976 Summer Olympics
Place of birth missing (living people)